Social Club Misfits, known as Social Club from 2012 until 2016, is a Christian hip hop duo from Miami, Florida made up of rappers FERN and Marty Mar. They formed their musical partnership in 2011 and released their first free album, entitled Misfits, on November 27, 2012. Then, the duo released two EPs entitled Misfits-EP, released on March 26, 2013, and Rejects. on April 2, 2013.  The latter garnering some charting success. The third free album from the duo came out on September 13, 2013, entitled Summer of George. Their breakthrough album, Misfits 2, was self-released on April 29, 2014, and Us was released on March 24, 2015.

Background
Social Club formed in the middle of 2011 in Miami, Florida. They rebranded themselves as Social Club Misfits in April 2016, when they signed to Capitol Christian Music Group.

History

EPs
The Christian hip hop duo released their first EP on March 26, 2013, entitled Misfits-EP, but it did not chart. Then, released Rejects. on April 2, 2013, and it saw some commercial charting success on the Billboard Gospel Albums and Christian Albums charts at Nos. 9 and 32 respectively. This occurred on April 20, 2013, charts. The EP was released by Social Club Misfits label. The duo released their third EP, The Misfit Generation, on May 6, 2016, through Capitol Christian Music Group under with their new name, Social Club Misfits.

Albums
The Christian hip hop duo released two free albums: Misfits on November 27, 2013, and Summer of George on September 13, 2013. Their third album, Misfits 2, released on April 29, 2014, charted at No. 59 on the Billboard 200 on May 17, 2014, and other Billboard charts such as Gospel Albums, Christian Albums, Independent Albums, Rap Albums at Nos. 3, 6, 14 and 10 respectively. Their third project, US, was released March 24, 2015 and charted at No. 9 on the Billboard Rap Albums and other Billboard charts such as Christian Albums, Independent Albums and 200, at Nos 3, 11, and 103, all on April 2, 2015. Their album, Mood // Doom, won the 2020 Dove Award for Rap / Hip-hop Album of the Year.

On Sept 30th, 2022 Social Club Misfits released "everyone loves a come back story", which has gained positive reviews.

Discography

Studio albums

EPs

Singles 

* Original version is on the Mood // Doom album.

Notes

References

External links 
 

Musical groups established in 2012
Christian hip hop groups
Southern hip hop groups
2012 establishments in Florida
Musical groups from Miami
American musical duos
Hip hop duos
American hip hop groups